Chicureo (from Mapudungun chikümn rewe 'place where lances are set up') is a Chilean town, Chacabuco Province, Santiago Metropolitan Region. Pop. 1,212 (2002 census).

Predominantly an agricultural area, Chicureo is home to several haciendas. As part of the town's history, Chicureo's 100-year-old northeast zone manor house, Hacienda Guay-Guay, is preserved intact.

Populated places in Chacabuco Province